Urola furvicornis is a moth in the family Crambidae. It was described by Philipp Christoph Zeller in 1877. It is found in Brazil.

References

Argyriini
Moths described in 1877